Ingvild Hedemann Rishøi (born 24 August 1978) is a Norwegian journalist and short story writer.

Biography
As a journalist she has worked for Dagbladet and Dagens Næringsliv, particularly within feature journalism. She issued the children's books Unbrakomonsteret – Ikea om natten (2007) and Pling i bollen – fine og ufine barnerim (2012) on Cappelen Damm, and the short story collections La stå (2007), Historien om Fru Berg (2011) and Vinternoveller (2014) on Gyldendal. She won the Sult Prize in 2012, the Brage Prize (open class) and the Norwegian Critics Prize for Literature in 2014.

References

External links 
 Ahlander Agency: Ingvild H. Rishøi

1978 births
Living people
Journalists from Oslo
Dagbladet people
Norwegian short story writers
Norwegian children's writers